Undine Eliza Anna Smith Moore (25 August 1904 – 6 February 1989), the "Dean of Black Women Composers", was an American composer and professor of music in the twentieth century. Moore was originally trained as a classical pianist, but developed a compositional output of mostly vocal music—her preferred genre. Much of her work was inspired by black spirituals and folk music. Undine Smith Moore was a renowned teacher, and once stated that she experienced "teaching itself as an art". Towards the end of her life, she received many awards for her accomplishments as a music educator.

Biography

Early life
Undine Smith Moore was born the youngest of three children to James William Smith and Hardie Turnbull Smith. She was the granddaughter of slaves. In 1908, her family moved to Petersburg, Virginia. Her hometown of Jarratt, Virginia, consisted of a large African-American population, and Moore would later recall memories of the community singing and praying at the Morningstar Baptist Church. Of her childhood, Moore said that "above all else, music reigned."

Education
At age seven, Undine Smith Moore began taking piano lessons under Lillian Allen Darden, who later encouraged her to attend Fisk University, where she studied piano and organ with Alice M. Grass and theory with Sara Leight Laubenstein. Moore turned down a scholarship to Petersburg's Virginia Normal Institute in order to enroll at Fisk, a historically black college. In 1924, the Juilliard School granted Moore their first ever scholarship to a student at Fisk, allowing her to continue her undergraduate studies. Moore graduated cum laude in 1926.

In 1931, during the Harlem Renaissance, Moore received a Master of Arts and professional diploma in music at Columbia University's Teachers College. From 1952-3, Moore studied composition with Howard Murphy at the Manhattan School of Music, and would often attend composition workshops at the Eastman School of Music.

Career
Although her teachers encouraged her to continue her studies by enrolling at the Juilliard School, Undine Smith Moore instead took a job as supervisor of music in the public schools in Goldsboro, North Carolina. In 1927, Moore was hired as piano instructor and organist at Virginia State College (now Virginia State University) in Petersburg, where she was also assigned with teaching classes in counterpoint and theory, for which she was "particularly renowned". The college appointed Moore director of the D. Webster Davis Laboratory High School chorus, and due to the school's low budget, Moore would write her own music to cater towards the students' needs.

In 1938, Undine Smith married Dr. James Arthur Moore, the chair of the physical education department at Virginia State College. The couple often performed together in recitals, as James Moore was a trained vocalist. On 4 January 1941 Moore gave birth to their daughter, Marie Hardie.

In 1969, Undine Smith Moore and Altona Trent Johns become co-founders of the Black Music Center at Virginia State College, which aimed to educate members about the "contributions of black people to the music of the United States and the world." Aside from teaching, Moore considered the Center to be her "most significant accomplishment. In 1972, the Black Music Center closed after Undine Smith Moore retired from Virginia State College. Moore traveled widely as a professor and lectured on black composers and also conducted workshops. Moore was a visiting professor at Carleton College and the College of Saint Benedict, and an adjunct professor at Virginia Union University during the 1970s. She continued her teaching career as a distinguished professor at Virginia Union University until 1976, meanwhile teaching at multiple colleges in Minnesota. Moore taught various musicians including Camilla Williams, Leon Thompson, Billy Taylor, Phil Medley, and Robert Fryson.

Honors
In 1973, Undine Smith Moore was presented with the Humanitarian award from Fisk University. In 1975, Moore was labeled music laureate of the state of Virginia, and the National Association of Negro Musicians named her an "outstanding educator". Indiana University awarded her an honorary doctorate the following year. Moore's contributions to music were recognized by the National Black Caucus, and in 1981 Moore was invited to deliver the keynote address at the first National Congress on Women in Music at New York University. Among her many awards was a Candace Award from the National Coalition of 100 Black Women in 1984. She was given the Virginia Governor's Award in the Arts in 1985.

Death
On 6 February 1989, aged 84, Undine Smith Moore suffered a stroke. At her funeral, several of her spiritual arrangements were performed. She was buried in the Eastview Cemetery in Petersburg, Virginia. A composition by Adolphus Hailstork, "I Will Lift Up Mine Eyes", was created in 1989 to honor her memory. A historical marker was approved in 2010 for installation in Petersburg. Moore was named one of the Virginia Women in History for 2017.

Music

Style
Looking back at her years at Fisk University, Undine Smith Moore described her early compositions, especially her piano music, as having a general similarity to the music of Leopold Godowsky. Her compositional style did not "include any African American elements", and Moore did not produce much music until 1953 (during her studies with Howard Murphy), when a "marked change in style took place". Moore would transcribe melodies that her mother sang, which gradually inspired her use of African-American spirituals in her music. Of these melodies and her adaptations of them to her music, Moore said:

In 1953, Moore composed the "powerful and dissonant" piano solo Before I'd be a Slave, "characterized by tone clusters, bitonality, and quartal harmonies"—a significant step away from her tonal vocal writing. Moore acknowledged that there was "almost always strong contrapuntal influence" in her music, which began leaning towards a more dissonant counterpoint after 1953. Helen Walker-Hill, author of From Spirituals to Symphonies, writes that Moore's compositional style was "freely tonal… sometimes strongly modal, often using twentieth-century techniques…, frequently using recitative… style, almost always strongly contrapuntal, and dominated by the black idiom." As for the influence of African-American traditional music, Walker-Hill writes:

In a volume of The Choral Journal, Carl Harris analyzes Moore's music as being influenced by "ragtime, blues, jazz, and gospel music". Moore herself, however, only acknowledged "black folk music and Bach as true influences". Of the philosophy of her music, Moore has stated:

Compositions
The works of Undine Smith Moore range "from arrangements of spirituals, to solo art songs, instrumental chamber music, and multimovement works for chorus, soloists, and instruments." Although she composed more than one hundred pieces between 1925 and 1987, only twenty-six were published during her lifetime. Moore wrote over 50 choral works, 21 compositions for solo voice and accompaniment, and 18 instrumental pieces. Most of this work occurred after 1950. The 1970s were Moore's "most prolific" years, with twenty-seven works composed.

In 1981, Moore's Pulitzer Prize-nominated oratorio Scenes from the Life of a Martyr was premiered at Carnegie Hall. The 16-part oratorio is based on the life of the Reverend Dr. Martin Luther King Jr. and written for chorus, orchestra, solo voices and narrator. Moore had planned the piece for at least five years, and considered it her "most significant work".

Philosophy 
Undine Smith Moore was outspoken on her thoughts surrounding the Civil Rights Movement and the impact it had on her music. In her youth, Moore experienced the full effect of the Jim Crow era. On looking back at her life, she later stated:

Moore was a strong advocate for the promotion of black music and art: in her opinion, art could be used as "a powerful agent for social change". Moore was careful to point out that because of the social issues surrounding African-Americans, their music and art could be stereotyped:

Selected works

Piano solo
 Valse Caprice (1930)
 Before I'd Be a Slave (1953)

Chamber ensemble
 Three Pieces for Flute and Piano (1958)
 Afro-American Suite (1969)
 Soweto (1987)

Voice(s) and piano
 Sir Olaf and the Erl King's Daughter (1925)
 Watch and Pray (1972)
 To be Baptized (1973)
 Lyric for TrueLove (1975)
 Come Down Angels and Trouble the Water (1978)

Chorus
 Daniel, Daniel, Servant of the Lord (1952)
 Tambourines to Glory (1973)
 We Shall Walk through the Valley (1977)

Chorus and orchestra
 Scenes from the Life of a Martyr (1981)

Recordings 
 "Daniel, Daniel, Servant of the Lord", on Steal Away: The African American Concert Spiritual (2016).
 Suite for Flute, Cello, and Piano on Songs for the Soul: Chamber Music by African American Composers (2010).
 "Before I'd be a Slave" on Soulscapes (2007).
 "Mother to Son" (1955), "We Shall Walk Through the Valley" (1977), "Tambourines to Glory" (1973), on Vocalessence Witness - Dance Like the Wind (2004).
 "To Be Baptised" (1973), "Set Down!" (1951), "I Want To Die While You Love Me" (1975), "Come Down Angels" (1978), on Ah! Love, But a Day - Songs and Spirituals of American Women (2000).
"To be Baptized" and "Watch and Pray". On The Angels Bowed Down: African American Spirituals.
 "Come Down Angels and Trouble the Water" (1978), "I am in Doubt" (1981), "Watch and Pray" (1973), "Love Let the Wind Cry How I Adore Thee" (1961), on Watch and Pray (1994).
"Tambourines to Glory" and "We Shall Walk through the Valley". On Dance like the Wind: Music of Today's Black Composers.

References

External links
 Brief biography (video)
 "I Heard the Preaching of the Elder" (video, 2013)
Stuart A. Rose Manuscript, Archives, and Rare Book Library, Emory University: Undine Smith Moore papers, 1770-2012

1904 births
1989 deaths
20th-century classical composers
20th-century American composers
20th-century American women musicians
20th-century women composers
African-American classical composers
American classical composers
African-American women classical composers
American women classical composers
American music educators
American women music educators
Carleton College faculty
College of Saint Benedict and Saint John's University faculty
Fisk University alumni
Juilliard School alumni
Teachers College, Columbia University alumni
Virginia State University faculty
American women academics
African-American women musicians
20th-century African-American women
20th-century African-American people
20th-century African-American musicians